Prata Camportaccio is a comune (municipality) in the Province of Sondrio in the Italian region Lombardy, located about  north of Milan and about  northwest of Sondrio.

Prata Camportaccio borders the following municipalities: Chiavenna, Gordona, Mese, Novate Mezzola, Piuro, Samolaco.

Demographic evolution

References

Cities and towns in Lombardy